"Easier Said Than Done" is a song by American R&B/soul singer Rahsaan Patterson, released in 2010. It is the official lead single from his latest album, Bleuphoria. The song was released on December 14, 2010, on iTunes and Amazon retail music website.

Track listing
US digital single

References

2010 singles
Rahsaan Patterson songs
Songs written by Rahsaan Patterson
2010 songs